The Río de la Mina is a river of Río Grande and  Luquillo in Puerto Rico.

Variant names
 Rio de la Mina	
 Rio la Mina

See also
 List of rivers of Puerto Rico

References

External links
 USGS Hydrologic Unit Map – Caribbean Region (1974)
 Ríos de Puerto Rico 
 

Wild and Scenic Rivers of the United States
Rivers of Puerto Rico
Río Grande, Puerto Rico